Okechukwu Edwards Ukeje, better known by his stage name Mr Raw (formerly Dat N.I.G.G.A. Raw), is a rapper from Abia State in Southeastern Nigeria. He is a pioneer of Igbo rap, a genre that now appeals to a broad, mainstream audience.

Early life 
Born and raised in Enugu, he gained prominence during the early 2000s rapping in the Igbo language and Pidgin English.

Career 
Raw's debut studio album, Right & Wrong, was released on 7 August 2005. A second album Everything Remains Raw followed in 2007. His third studio album End of Discussion was released in October 2010. The album yielded the hit song "O! Chukwu" whose music video won Best Afro Hip Hop Video at the NMVA Awards that year.

In 2010, Raw announced that he would change his name from "Dat Nigga Raw" (an acronym of "Dat Nigerian Guy Anakpo Raw" which means "that Nigerian guy called Raw") to "Mr. Raw", stating that the negative connotations associated to the word "nigga" resulted in his name being censored abroad and prevented people from purchasing his music online.

Raw has collaborated with numerous other musical artists including Flavour N'abania, Duncan Mighty, Phyno, Illbliss, 2Face, M-Josh, Hype MC, BosaLin and Slowdog.

Personal life 
Ukeje is married, but has cited that he prefers to keep his family life private. In August 2021, he and his driver were hospitalised due to a fatal car accident.

Discography

Studio albums
Right & Wrong (2005)
Everything Remains Raw (2007)
End of Discussion (2010)
The Greatest (2012)

References

Living people
Igbo rappers
Rappers from Enugu
Nigerian male rappers
21st-century Nigerian musicians
21st-century male musicians
Year of birth missing (living people)